Phoebe Banura (born 1994 or 1995) is a Ugandan footballer who plays as a defender for FUFA Women Super League club UCU Lady Cardinals FC and the Uganda women's national team.

Club career
Banura has played for UCU Lady Cardinals in Uganda.

International career
Banura capped for Uganda at senior level during the 2021 COSAFA Women's Championship.

References

External links

1990s births
Living people
Sportspeople from Kampala
Uganda Christian University alumni
Ugandan women's footballers
Women's association football defenders
Uganda women's international footballers